Armel may refer to:
Armel, Virginia, unincorporated community in Frederick County, Virginia, United States
Saint Armel, early 6th century Breton holy man
 Armel, a member of the Wu-Tang Clan affiliates
ARM architecture, embedded ABI, little endian